Bruno Conceição Praxedes (born 8 February 2002), known as Bruno Praxedes or just Praxedes, is a Brazilian professional footballer who plays as a midfielder for Red Bull Bragantino.

Professional career
Praxedes made his professional debut with Internacional in a 0-0 Campeonato Gaúcho tie with Ypiranga on 1 February 2020.

References

External links
 
 Internacional Profile 

2002 births
Living people
Sportspeople from Rio de Janeiro (state)
Brazilian footballers
Brazil youth international footballers
Brazil under-20 international footballers
Association football midfielders
Campeonato Brasileiro Série A players
Sport Club Internacional players
Red Bull Bragantino players
People from Itaboraí